Bratenahl Place is the first high-rise condominium building in the state of Ohio. Construction was completed in 1967. It is located in Bratenahl on the shore of Lake Erie, six miles East of downtown Cleveland. Bratenahl Place is situated on 18 acres of gated green space and bordered by conserved property. Bratenahl Place consists of two 16 story buildings with underground parking. It is a luxury living community with many amenities including an in-ground pool, clay tennis courts, picnic grounds, fire pit, and walking paths.

The buildings, of brutalist architectural design, were built on the lakefront to create an opportunity for comfortable luxury condominium dwelling in a municipality where previously only free-standing single-family housing existed. One of the two structures was originally intended to be a 180-unit rental apartment building, while the other, smaller one was a condominium from its inception. In 1976 however, the larger one also became a condominium, and the ultimate success of these two condominium associations heralded a diversification of housing types in Bratenahl Village since that time. Condominium suites in these two structures range in price from $150,000 to over $1.0 million.

Nicholas Satterlee & Associates of Washington, D.C. was the architectural firm that designed both buildings.  Nicholas Satterlee’s wife, Sally Hitchcock Satterlee, grew up in Bratenahl as a child. Although most of the units in both buildings had universal floor plans, John Terence Kelly collaborated with Nicholas Satterlee on some of the interior design work, particular with those units that had customized features.

References

Residential buildings in Ohio
Residential condominiums in the United States
Residential skyscrapers in the United States
1967 establishments in Ohio
Residential buildings completed in 1967